The 1987–88 Wyoming Cowboys basketball team represented the University of Wyoming in the 1987–88 NCAA Division I men's basketball season. (The school uses "Cowboys" solely for men's sports; women's teams and athletes at the school are known as "Cowgirls".)

Fennis Dembo was featured on the cover of the November 18, 1987, issue of Sports Illustrated. It was the first time that a Wyoming Cowboy basketball player was featured on the cover. Dembo would finish his Wyoming career as the Cowboys scoring leader, 2,311 points

Roster

Regular season

Player stats

NCAA basketball tournament
West
 Loyola Marymount (10) 119, Wyoming (7) 115

Rankings

Team players drafted into the NBA

Awards and honors
Fennis Dembo, First Team All-Western Athletic Conference

References

Wyoming Cowboys basketball seasons
Wyoming
Wyoming
1987 in sports in Wyoming
1988 in sports in Wyoming